Ken Spillman (born 11 June 1959) is an Australian writer based in Perth, Western Australia, whose work has spanned diverse genres including poetry, sports writing and literary criticism. He is best known as a prolific author of books for children and young adults. His output also includes a large number of books relating to aspects of Australian social history.

Early life 
Born in London to Australian parents, Spillman spent his childhood in Sydney and Perth. He was active in amateur theatre during his teens and also performed in a school rock band. Encouraged to write by a teacher at Newman College, Perth, he began publishing poetry and stories after moving to Brisbane to attend Griffith University.

Non-fiction career 
From 1977 Spillman began an association with Griffith University academic Ross Fitzgerald, researching Fitzgerald's book From the Dreaming to 1915: A History of Queensland. The pair later collaborated in compiling a landmark collection of literary writing on Australian rules football, The Greatest Game, as well as Fathers in Writing.

Spillman's first major solo publication was concerning the history of Subiaco, Western Australia, Identity Prized, which was launched by Sir Paul Hasluck, a former Governor-General, at an open-air function attended by more than a thousand people. Spillman returned for a follow-up history of Subiaco some 20 years later. Tied in with writing and research of the Subiaco book, he also conducted interviews which are now part of the Battye Library oral history collection. After completing this book, Spillman worked with Professor Gordon Reid on a thematic history of the Parliament of Australia.

Subsequently, Spillman wrote books on mining in Western Australia, Bankwest, the Shire of Mundaring, the Shire of Victoria Plains, Edith Cowan University, a surf lifesaving club, a ballet college, a major hospital and a number of Western Australian schools and sporting clubs.

According to Rod Moran, former books editor of The West Australian, "Ken Spillman writes history in a marvellously lucid style, one enhanced further by a keen turn of phrase, or sharp observation, at an appropriate moment in the narrative. He writes the history of institutions with a deep sense of their broader context, and underpins his analysis with an admirable command of the primary sources."

In 2008, after the publication of his 17th work of non-fiction, Spillman made it known that he had decided to give priority to his fiction career.

Fiction career 

After a successful full-length fiction debut in 1999 with the highly acclaimed novel Blue, Spillman wrote three children's books with writer and comedian Jon Doust. One of these, Magpie Mischief was shortlisted for a Wilderness Society Environment Award. These collaborations were subsequently re-released as ebooks with new illustrations by James Foley.

Spillman's 2007 novel for teenagers, Love is a UFO won the Western Australian Premier's Book Awards, but his international success can be traced to the launch of the "Jake" series of books for early readers, which began with Jake's Gigantic List in 2009.  A celebration of books and reading, Jake's Gigantic List is dedicated to the Children's Book Council of Australia, to which Spillman has donated royalties. The Jake series has appeared in close to 20 nations and languages, and is especially popular in India.

In 2011, Spillman launched another series for young readers titled The Absolutely True Fantasies of Daydreamer Dev. Four years later, his 12-book "Virtues" series was released in South East Asia. This drew its inspiration from the global, grass-roots Virtues Project, founded in Canada in 1991. Myra Garces-Bacsal, a professor at Singapore's National Institute of Education, wrote of this series: "This series by Ken Spillman demonstrates sensitivity towards children's emotions and profound respect for children's judgement, without being didactic."

Spillman's picture books include The Strange Story of Felicity Frown, The Great Storyteller, Rahul and the Dream Bat, The Auto That Flew, The Magic Bird and Clumsy! He has also written a picture book for all ages titled The Circle. This deals with such issues as deforestation, human displacement, refugees and multiculturalism.

Philanthropy 

Spillman is known to support many foundations working with disadvantaged children through the donation of books and money. He has also interacted with the children served by such foundations in a number of Indian cities and Malaysia.

Works

Non-fiction
 (1985)  Identity Prized : a history of Subiaco Nedlands, W.A. : University of Western Australia Press for the City of Subiaco 
 (1988)  Custodians and Champions : the story of the City of Perth Surf Life Saving Club Perth, W.A : The Club. 
 (1989)  Horizons: A history of the R&I Bank of Western Australia / Nedlands, W.A. : University of Western Australia Press,   
 (1993) A Rich Endowment : government and mining in Western Australia 1829–1994 Nedlands, W.A : University of Western Australia Press for the Dept. of Minerals and Energy in association with the Centre for Western Australian History, the University of Western Australia,  
 (1997) A Club for All Seasons : the story of the Wembley Athletic Club 1926–1996 / by Andy Collins and Ken Spillman.  Wembley, W.A. : The Club, 1997.  
 (1998, 2000)  Diehards : the story of the Subiaco Football Club Subiaco, W.A. : Subiaco Football Club, 1896–2000.  (pt. I)  (pt. II)
 (2003) Life was meant to be here : community and local government in the Shire of Mundaring Mundaring, W.A. : Shire of Mundaring, 
 (2005) Hands to the Plough : the Shire of Victoria Plains since 1945 . Calingiri, W.A. : Shire of Victoria Plains.. 
 (2006) Tales of a Singular City : Subiaco since the 1970s . Subiaco, W.A. : City of Subiaco. 
 (2006) Raising Edith : the transformation of a new generation university : Edith Cowan University 1995–2005  Mount Lawley, W.A. : Edith Cowan University. 
 (2007) For the Good of Many: The story of the Australian Pensioners' League and Retirees WA / Perth, W.A.: Retirees WA.
 (2008) Fifty and counting: Sir Charles Gairdner Hospital's first half century / Nedlands, W.A.: Sir Charles Gairdner Hospital.

Fiction
 (1999) Blue : a novel / South Fremantle, W.A. : Fremantle Press.  
 (2002) Magpie Mischief (Jon Doust, co-author) / South Fremantle, W.A. : Fremantle Press. 
 (2005) Magwheel Madness  (Jon Doust, co-author) / South Fremantle, W.A. : Fremantle Press. 
 (2007) "Love is a UFO" / Sydney, Australia : Pan Macmillan. 
 (2009) Jake's Gigantic List /  South Fremantle, W.A. : Fremantle Press. 
 (2010) Jake's Monster Mess /  South Fremantle, W.A. : Fremantle Press.  
 (2010) Jake's Balloon Blast / Kuala Lumpur, Malaysia : Scholastic Inc. 
 (2011) "Advaita The Writer" / Chennai, India : Tulika. 
 (2011) Jake's Great Game / South Fremantle, W.A. : Fremantle Press.  
 (2012) Jake's Concert Horror / South Fremantle, W.A. : Fremantle Press.  
 (2012) "Radhika Takes the Plunge" / New Delhi, India : Young Zubaan. 
 (2013) Jake's Cooking Craze / South Fremantle, W.A. : Fremantle Press.  
 (2014) "I Am Oscar" / Gurgaon, India : Scholastic Inc. 
 (2014) The Circle / Singapore: Armour Publishing. 
 (2014) "The Great Storyteller"  / Kuala Lumpur, Malaysia : Scholastic Inc.  
 (2014) "Rahul and the Dream Bat" / New Delhi, India : National Book Trust. 
 (2014) "Everlasting Tales"  / Gurgaon, India : Scholastic Inc.  
 (2015) "The Auto That Flew" / Bangalore, India: Pratham Books. 
 (2015) "All-Time Favourite Fairy Tales: Little Red Riding Hood and Goldilocks" / Gurgaon, India : Scholastic Inc.  
 (2015) "All-Time Favourite Fairy Tales: Beauty and the Beast and Hansel and Gretel" / Gurgaon, India : Scholastic Inc.  
 (2015) "The Magic Bird" / Kuala Lumpur, Malaysia : Magicbird Publishing. 
 (2015) Jake's Cash Quest / Gurgaon, India : Scholastic Inc. 
 (2015) "Sophie's Moment of Truth" (Virtues Series) / Singapore : Armour. 
 (2015) "Dylan Owns Up" (Virtues Series) / Singapore : Armour. 
 (2015) "Grace Under Pressure" (Virtues Series) / Singapore : Armour. 
 (2015) "Nicholas Floats an Idea" (Virtues Series) / Singapore : Armour. 
 (2015) "James Works It Out" (Virtues Series) / Singapore : Armour. 
 (2015) "Zara's Time to Grow" (Virtues Series) / Singapore : Armour. 
 (2015) "Ethan Makes it Right" (Virtues Series) / Singapore : Armour. 
 (2015) "Tessa Stands Tall" (Virtues Series) / Singapore : Armour. 
 (2015) "Ryan Teams Up" (Virtues Series) / Singapore : Armour. 
 (2015) "Emily's Heart of Gold " (Virtues Series) / Singapore : Armour. 
 (2015) "Brandon's Big Test" (Virtues Series) / Singapore : Armour. 
 (2015) "Mikaela Finds Her Voice" (Virtues Series) / Singapore : Armour.  
 (2016) "Clumsy!" / Chennai, India : Tulika. 
 (2016) "Aesop's Fables Vol. 1" / Gurgaon, India : Scholastic Inc.

References

External links
Official website

1959 births
Australian children's writers
Australian male novelists
Living people
Historians from Western Australia
Griffith University alumni
English people of Australian descent
People educated at Newman College, Perth
Writers from Perth, Western Australia